Luke Records is an American record label formed in 1985 by Luther Campbell, the former producer and hypeman of 2 Live Crew, and David Chackler, and based in Miami, Florida. It was one of the first recording labels devoted almost exclusively to Southern hip-hop.

The label was originally called Luke Skyywalker Records; however, because it was not found to be of fair use, Campbell shortened his pseudonym to Luke (a result of George Lucas' successful lawsuit over Campbell appropriating the Skywalker name).
 
From 1990 to 1993, the label was distributed by Atlantic Records. The label's catalogue is owned by Lil' Joe Records.

References

External links

American record labels
Vanity record labels
Record labels established in 1985
Hip hop record labels
Atlantic Records
American companies established in 1985
Naming controversies